"The Heater" was the first single from Salty, the second album by the New Zealand band, The Mutton Birds. Released early in 1994, it reached number one in the New Zealand music charts, their only number 1.

Music video 
Its music video starred Elizabeth McRae, well known at the time for playing Marjorie Brasch in the New Zealand soap opera Shortland Street.

Novel mention 
The song is mentioned in the Christopher Brookmyre novel Be My Enemy.

Track listing
"The Heater"
"The Ballad of Kelvin"
"He Turned Around"
"It Happened One Night"

1994 singles
Number-one singles in New Zealand
The Mutton Birds songs
1993 songs
Virgin Records singles
Songs written by Don McGlashan

References